Jassy is a 1947 British colour film historical melodrama set in the early 19th century, based on a novel by Norah Lofts. It is a Gainsborough melodrama, the only one to be made in Technicolor. It was the last "official" Gainsborough melodrama.

Plot
Christopher Hatton owns the country estate Mordelaine. While Hatton's son Barney has a romantic tryst with Dilys Helmar, Hatton loses his estate in a game of dice to Dilys' father Nick.

The Hattons are forced to move to a cottage in a nearby village. One day Barney sees some villagers attacking a young woman, whom he rescues. She is Jassy Woodroofe, daughter of Tom Woodroofe and a gypsy mother. Jassy has the gift of second sight which causes the villagers to regard her as a witch.

Mrs Hatton hires Jassy as a domestic servant. Meanwhile, blacksmith Bob Wicks whips his daughter Lindy so badly she becomes mute, despite Tom Woodroofe coming to her rescue.

Nick Helmar and his family move into Mordelaine. Nick allows Christopher Hatton to continue gambling. When Hatton is caught cheating, he kills himself.

Nick finds his wife has been having an affair and asks for a divorce.

Tom Woodroofe leads a crowd of villagers to march on the Helmars, who are now their landlords, to demand better pay and conditions. Back in the village, Jassy senses something bad will happen and asks Barney to help. A drunken Nick confronts Tom and accidentally shoots him.

Jassy and Barney become close which worries Barney's mother. She sends her to a ladies' finishing school where she becomes friends with Dilys Helmar. Dilys sneaks out for a romantic tryst one night and when Jassy covers for her, Jassy is sacked.

Dilys takes Jassy home with her to Mordelaine. Nick tells Jassy that he killed her father.

Dilys and Jassy go to see Barney. Dilys and Barney resume their romance, which upsets Jassy, who still loves Barney and knows that Dilys is also seeing Stephen Fennell.

Nick offers Jassy the job of running Mordelaine. Jassy restructures of the staff, hiring the still mute Lindy at the recommendation of Mrs Wicks, but firing almost all the female staff.

One day, Jassy catches Dilys and Stephen together. Nick horsewhips Dilys, who runs out into the arms and carriage of Stephen. Barney goes to see Stephen and finds that he and Dilys are engaged.

Nick proposes marriage to Jassy, who agrees on condition he gives her Mordelaine as a wedding gift. They marry, but Jassy insists on living separately as their legal agreement says nothing of sleeping together. In a fury, Nick goes out riding and has an accident.

He is brought back to Mordelaine, where the doctor prescribes a strict diet and no alcohol, which Jassy enforces, even though Nick is increasingly violent towards her. When Jassy goes to visit Dilys and Stephen, Lindy decides to poison Nick for what he's done to Jassy, slipping rat poison into a bottle of brandy. Nick drinks it greedily.

Nick's murder is sensed by Jassy, who cries out that he's dead. Stephen thinks that this means that she has murdered him, and has her arrested along with Lindy.

At the trial, despite Jassy's alibi, both she and Lindy are found guilty, but the shock goads Lindy into speech. She confesses to the murder, exonerates Jassy, and drops dead.

Jassy signs over Mordelaine to Barney, its rightful heir, and explains she only married Nick to get the estate back to him, and the reunited couple kiss.

Cast
 Margaret Lockwood as Jassy Woodroofe
 Patricia Roc as Dilys Helmar
 Dennis Price as Christopher Hatton
 Basil Sydney as Nick Helmar
 Dermot Walsh as Barney Hatton
 Esma Cannon as Lindy Wicks
 Cathleen Nesbitt as Elizabeth Twisdale
 Linden Travers as Beatrice Helmar
 Nora Swinburne as Mrs. Hatton
 Ernest Thesiger as Sir Edward Follesmark
 Jean Cadell as Meggie
 Grace Arnold as Housemaid
 John Laurie as Tom Woodroofe
 Grey Blake as Stephen Fennell
 Bryan Coleman as Sedley – the architect
 Clive Morton as Sir William Fennell
 Torin Thatcher as Bob Wicks
 Beatrice Varley as Mrs. Wicks
 Eliot Makeham as Moult – the butler
 Maurice Denham as Jim Stoner
 Alan Wheatley as Sir Edward Walker – Prosecuting Counsel
 Hugh Pryse as Sir John Penty – Defending Counsel

Production
The film was based on a novel by Norah Lofts, originally published in 1944. Film rights were bought by Gainsborough Pictures who in 1946 saw Maurice Ostrer replaced as head of production by Sydney Box. In his last years, Ostrer had specialized in making melodramas that had been highly lucrative to the studio, many of which starred Margaret Lockwood. Box wanted to expand the variety of Gainsborough's output, but when he arrived Jassy was the only script ready to go into production. It would have been more expensive to let the sound stages go idle so the film went ahead. In August 1946 Box announced Gainsborough would make Jassy.

By this stage Gainsborough had lost the services of a number of people crucial to the success of the Gainsborough melodramas, including Leslie Arliss, Ted Black, Maurice Ostrer, Harold Huth and R. J. Minney.

John Cromwell was originally announced as director.

The film was given a large budget. It was considered a "special", i.e. one of the most expensive made by Gainsborough, and the first film shot in Technicolor there.

According to Dermot Walsh "they offered the part of my father to Peter Graves who turned it down on the grounds that playing father to a twenty one year old boy would make him look too old. So poor old Denis [Price] was trundled out."

Susan Shaw has a small role.
Wilfred Bramble is one of the servants

Reception

Box Office
The film was the seventh most popular movie at the British box office in 1947. By 1953 Jassy had earned net revenue of £200,000 and its box office performance was described as "excellent".

This encouraged Sydney Box to make two more costume film "specials", The Bad Lord Byron and Christopher Columbus, the financial failure of which ended the cycle.

Critical
The Los Angeles Times liked the photography but criticised the acting and direction.

The New York Times said that:
With plot ramifications providing for infidelity, suicide, murders and a gypsy beauty endowed with second sight, it would seem that "Jassy" would add up to a swift and exciting movie. But this period piece, brilliantly accoutered in Technicolor and imported from England to begin a stand at the Winter Garden yesterday, is unimaginative drama, hampered rather than helped by its story lines and not too greatly aided by some broad and stylized characterizations. Boiled down to essentials, "Jassy" is a combination of several plots, mostly familiar, the sum of which makes for a rather rambling and routine entertainment.
Filmink said "like Hungry Hill the film has all these elements that make it sound like it’s going to be fun – suicide, cheating at cards, poison, second sight, someone being struck dumb, not one but two whippings – but it isn’t, mostly because, just like Hungry Hill, the film has no focus."

References

Bibliography
 Cook, Pam (ed.). Gainsborough Pictures. Cassell, 1997.

External links

Jassy at TCMDB
Jassy at BFI Screenonline
 
Review of film at Variety
Jassy at Britmovie
Serialisation of novel – Part 1, Part 2, Part 3, Part 4, Part 5A, Part 5B, Part 6, Part 7, Part 8, Part 9, Part 10, Part 11, Part 12, Part 13, Part 14, Part 15, Part 17, Part 18, Part 19, Part 20, Part 21, Part 22, Part 23 and final 

1947 films
Melodrama films
Gainsborough Pictures films
Films directed by Bernard Knowles
British drama films
1947 drama films
1940s English-language films
1940s British films